The Nodaway River is a  river in southwest Iowa and northwest Missouri.

Etymology
The river's name (as "Nodawa") first appears in the journal of Lewis and Clark, who camped at the mouth of the river on July 8, 1804, but who provide no derivation of the name. The name is an Otoe-Missouria term meaning "jump over water".  The term would be spelled today in full as Nyi At'ąwe (nyi (water) + a- (on) + t'ąwe (jump)) and would be contracted in regular speech as Nyat'ąwe or Nat'ąwe.

History
Lewis and Clark camped at the river's mouth on Nodaway Island on July 8, 1804, by Nodaway, Missouri, on the border of Holt County, Missouri and Andrew County, Missouri and took note of the river.

Lewis and Clark liked the spot enough that they recommended it for the winter headquarters of Astor Expedition of 1810–12 that discovered the South Pass in Wyoming through which hundreds of settlers on the Oregon Trail, California Trail, Mormon Trail were to pass.

The river is navigable only by shallow fishing and row boats although steam ships navigated just inside its mouth.  The river was the primary route for white settlers including Amos Graham and Isaac Hogan following the Platte Purchase of 1836 which opened northwest Missouri for settlement.  Nodaway County, which derives its name from the river, was by far the biggest county in the purchase and the fourth largest in the state of Missouri.

Description
Major tributaries in the Nodaway River basin are Seven Mile Creek, West Nodaway River, East Nodaway River, Middle Nodaway River, Clear Creek, Mill Creek, Elkhorn Creek, and Arapahoe Creek. The biggest town on the river is Clarinda, Iowa.

The Nodaway begins near Shambaugh, Iowa at the confluence of the East and West Nodaway rivers. The East and West Nodaway join to form the Nodaway River four miles (6 km) north of the Iowa-Missouri border, and the river enters Missouri near Clearmont, Missouri.

The Platte River basin is to the east and the Grand River and Des Moines River basins to the northeast, with the latter defining the boundary between the Missouri River and Mississippi River basins. The west side is bound by the Tarkio River basin and in the northwest by the Nishnabotna River basin.

The Nodaway River basin is prone to extensive flooding and can contribute as much as 20% of the flood crest of the Missouri River near its mouth.

At Graham, Missouri its normal flow is 1,011 cubic feet per second (28.6 m³/s).  But during the Great Flood of 1993 the river was flowing 78,300 ft³/s (2220 m³/s) at Graham.

See also
List of rivers of Iowa
Florida Creek

Notes

References
Bright, William (2004). Native American Placenames of the United States. Norman: University of Oklahoma Press.
Thwaites, Reuben Gold (1905), Early Western Travels - 1748-1846. Vol. 17. The Lakeside Press. 
Trigger, Bruce, ed. (1978) Northeast. Vol. 15 of Handbook of North American Indians, ed. William C. Sturtevant. Washington, D.C.: Smithsonian Institution.

External links
 Missouri Watershed report
 National Weather Service data on Nodaway River at Burlington Junction

Rivers of Iowa
Rivers of Missouri
Lewis and Clark Expedition
Tributaries of the Missouri River
Rivers of Page County, Iowa
Rivers of Holt County, Missouri
Rivers of Nodaway County, Missouri
Rivers of Andrew County, Missouri